Stan Boyd (born September 16, 1970) is an American former professional stock car racing driver who competed in both the Busch Series and NASCAR Craftsman Truck Series.

Truck Series
Stan Boyd made his NASCAR debut in the 1998 Memphis race driving for EVI Motorsports, starting 35th and finishing 29th after ignition failure late in the race. He ran at Mesa Marin for Steve Coulter later in the year, dropping out after just 2 laps due to engine failure.

Boyd then ran four races in 1999 for EVI Motorsports with a best finish of 22nd at Gateway. In 2000 Boyd ran two races for John Conely, finishing a solid 19th at Mesa Marin. He returned to EVI for 3 races later on with less luck. He ran a full season with EVI in 2001, making just 10 of the 25 races, but earning three top 20 finishes including a career-best 13th at California.

He continued the same schedule for EVI in 2002, making 13 races out of 25, improving on last season, but scoring just one top 20 finish at Fort Worth. He ran the first 2 races of 2003 for EVI with a 16th at Daytona and a 15th at Darlington. He then ran 2 races for Gene Cristensen before making 4 races for Ware Racing Enterprises, start and parking in all of those races. He then returned to EVI, but only made 4 more races and one more top 20 finish.

Busch Series
Stan Boyd made his Busch Series debut at Dover in 2003 for MacDonald Motorsports, starting 32nd and finishing 5 laps down in 23rd. It was his only start of the year.

Boyd moved full-time to the Busch Series in 2004 with Ware Racing Enterprises. He attempted Daytona with the team's second car, the #57, with Kevin Conway as his teammate in the #51. Both failed to qualify. Boyd would not make another attempt until Darlington, which he made, but suffered engine failure early on and finished 41st.

Boyd moved over to the #51 at Bristol with Morgan Shepherd taking over the #57. Boyd qualified 33rd and finished a solid 25th, 4 laps down. He failed to make the next two races and then Kim Crosby ran the car at Talladega. Boyd then made California, but coming into the pits he spun, knocking two tires into his own pit crew. He finished 38th. Boyd then finished 32nd after engine failure at Gateway. Shepherd ran the #51 at Richmond with Travis Powell running at Nazareth. Boyd returned at Charlotte and made the field, but Joe Gibbs Racing bought them out and placed J. J. Yeley, who had failed to qualify, into the car. Boyd made the field at Dover but crashed out on lap 34, finishing 38th. David Eshleman ran the #51 at Nashville, but Boyd returned at Kentucky, finishing last after parking the car on lap 2.

With Bobby Dotter, Kim Crosby, and Blake Mallory running the next three races, Boyd did not see another race until New Hampshire, where he had to park the car on lap 17 as funding was decreasing. Boyd moved back to the #57 with Crosby running the #51 at Pike's Peak. Both would start and park on lap 11. Boyd then got to run the whole Indianapolis Raceway Park race in the #57, finishing 27th, 4 laps down. Boyd then left Ware Racing to join MacDonald Motorsports.

His career with the MacDonald team began at California where he ran a backup car, the #71. He parked on lap 10, finishing 38th. He did not attempt any more races until Kansas, where he failed to qualify. At Memphis, Boyd ran a third car, the #70, but again failed to qualify. Boyd got to run the team's main #72 car for the final two races of the season, finishing a solid 26th just three laps down at Darlington. At Homestead-Miami he finished 32nd, four laps down. However, he wasn't kept on for 2005.

He returned to the series in 2005 at Atlanta with Means Racing, but failed to qualify. He later attempted Kentucky in 2006 with Keith Coleman Racing in the #23, but again failed to qualify. He has not attempted a race since.

Motorsports career results

NASCAR
(key) (Bold – Pole position awarded by qualifying time. Italics – Pole position earned by points standings or practice time. * – Most laps led.)

Nextel Cup Series

Busch Series

Craftsman Truck Series

ARCA Re/Max Series
(key) (Bold – Pole position awarded by qualifying time. Italics – Pole position earned by points standings or practice time. * – Most laps led.)

References

External links
 

1970 births
Living people
NASCAR drivers
People from Holly, Michigan
Racing drivers from Michigan
ARCA Menards Series drivers